Thomson Junction is a railway marshalling yard about four miles northwest of Hwange (formerly called Wankie), in the Zimbabwe coal fields area. Thomson Junction is named after A. R. Thomson Esq., General Manager of Wankie Colliery for many years.

Trains coming from the south and destined for Victoria Falls and further north into Zambia, and trains coming from the north going south to Bulawayo and onwards, are marshalled for their onward journeys at Thomson Junction marshalling yard.

External links

 Hwange Colliery

Rail infrastructure in Zimbabwe
Rail transport in Rhodesia